Lippo Center is a  skyscraper located at 78 Shenton Way in Singapore's Downtown Core. It was completed in 1990, has 34 floors, and is tied with two buildings of The Gateway as the 43rd-tallest building in the city-state. It was sold to Commerz Real AG for US$650 million in December 2007.

Resource Pacific Holdings Pte Ltd, a company that is located on the 28th floor of the Lippo Center, currently houses the Honorary Consulate of Jamaica.

See also
 List of tallest buildings in Singapore

References

Skyscraper office buildings in Singapore
Office buildings completed in 1990
20th-century architecture in Singapore